Jorelyn Daniela Carabalí Martínez (born 18 May 1997) is a Colombian professional footballer who plays as a centre back for Brazilian Série A1 club Atlético Mineiro and the Colombia women's national team.

Club career
In January 2023, Carabalí joined Brazilian club Atlético Mineiro.

International career
Carabalí made her international debut in a friendly againtst the United States on 18 January 2021. On 3 July 2022, she was called up by Nelson Abadía to represent Colombia at the 2022 Copa América Femenina.

Honours
Deportivo Cali
Liga Femenina Profesional: 2021

Colombia
Copa América Femenina runner-up: 2022

Notes

References

External links

1997 births
Living people
Sportspeople from Valle del Cauca Department
Colombian women's footballers
Women's association football defenders
Colombia women's international footballers
21st-century Colombian women
Atlético Huila (women) players
Deportivo Cali (women) players
Clube Atlético Mineiro (women) players